Oconee County is the name of two counties in the United States:

 Oconee County, Georgia 
 Oconee County, South Carolina